Philemon was Greek Orthodox Patriarch of Antioch (1766–1767).

Literature

External links
 Primates of the Apostolic See of Antioch

Greek Orthodox Patriarchs of Antioch
18th-century Eastern Orthodox archbishops